Rome Independent Film Festival (or RIFF) is an annual film festival held every November in Rome, Italy to represent and promote independent filmmakers globally. The festival was started in 2001, and its 25th event was held in 2018. In November 2019, the 26th festival event will be held.

The festival 
Rome Independent Film Festival was first started in 2001 in Rome. In 2006's event Self Medicated by Monty Lapica was the winning film, in 2007 Punk Love by Nick Lyon, in 2008 The Class by Ilmar Raag, in 2009 Hunger by Steve McQueen, and in 2010's event Fish Tank by Andrea Arnold were among the major independent winners of the festival.

At the 17th event in 2018, the festival's main focus was on screening films from Albania and Spain and also based on LGBT issues.

References

External links 
 

Film festivals in Rome
November events
Annual events in Italy
Tourist attractions in Rome
Italian film awards
Film festivals established in 2001